Kirn-Sulzbach (also: Kirnsulzbach) is a Stadtteil of Kirn in the district of Bad Kreuznach, in Rhineland-Palatinate, Germany.

See also
 Kirn-Sulzbach in German Language

References

Geography of Rhineland-Palatinate
Naheland